Karakumosa is a genus of Asian wolf spiders first described by Dmitri V. Logunov and A. V. Ponomarev in 2020.

Species
 it contains ten species:
K. alticeps (Kroneberg, 1875) – Kazakhstan
K. badkhyzica Logunov & Ponomarev, 2020 – Turkmenistan
K. gromovi Logunov & Ponomarev, 2020 – Uzbekistan
K. medica (Pocock, 1889) – Afghanistan
K. repetek Logunov & Ponomarev, 2020 (type) – Turkmenistan
K. reshetnikovi Logunov & Fomichev, 2021 – Tajikistan
K. shmatkoi Logunov & Ponomarev, 2020 – Azerbaijan, Russia (Europe), Kazakhstan
K. tashkumyr Logunov & Ponomarev, 2020 – Kyrgyzstan
K. turanica Logunov & Ponomarev, 2020 – Turkmenistan
K. zyuzini Logunov & Ponomarev, 2020 – Uzbekistan

See also
 Hogna
 Lycosa
 List of Lycosidae species

References

Further reading

Lycosidae genera
Spiders of Asia